Jack Peter Shepherd (born 14 January 1988) is a British actor. He is best known for his role as David Platt in the ITV soap opera Coronation Street. He won the award for Best Young Actor in 2001 at The Inside Soap Awards and Best Bad Boy at The Inside Soap Awards in 2007. He has won two British Soap Awards. Villain of the Year in 2008 and Best Actor in 2018. He also won the award for Best Soap Actor at The TV Choice Awards in 2020.

Career
Before taking on the role of David, Shepherd had appeared in episodes of TV's Where the Heart Is and Clocking Off, where he starred with his future Coronation Street screen sister Tina O'Brien.

Shepherd has taken time out of Coronation Street to do theatre work, including the role of Riff in a production of West Side Story as part of Stage 84 The Yorkshire School of Performing Arts. He has also appeared in Oliver! at Bradford's Alhambra theatre.

In 2008, Shepherd appeared in Ghosthunting with Coronation Street on the Isle of Man.

Shepherd uses his middle initial in his stage name as there is already a well-known British actor named Jack Shepherd.

He is also a contributor to the topical show Grouchy Young Men, a spin-off of the show Grumpy Old Men, on the British version of Comedy Central.

Personal life
Shepherd was in a relationship with Lauren Shippey for fifteen years from 2002 to 2017 and the couple have two children together: a daughter, Nyla, born in 2009 and a son, Reuben, born in 2013.

Shepherd is a Leeds United supporter.

Filmography

Guest appearances

This Morning (2003, 2006, 2007, 2008, 2010, 2018, 2019)
Loose Women (2006, 2007, 2020, 2022)
Celebrity Juice (2010, 2012, 2013, 2014)
Xposé (2011)
Lorraine (2011, 2016, 2019)
All Star Mr & Mrs (2012)
Daybreak (2012, 2013)
Tipping Point (2013)
The Chase (2012, 2019)
All Star Family Fortunes (2014)
Keep It in the Family (2015)
You're Back in the Room (2015)
Ant and Dec's Saturday Night Takeaway (2016)
Good Morning Britain (2016)
Saturday Mash-Up! (2017)

Awards and nominations

References

External links
 

1988 births
Living people
English male child actors
English male soap opera actors
People from Pudsey
Male actors from Leeds
20th-century English male actors
21st-century English male actors